Austroblechnum leyboldtianum, synonym Blechnum blechnoides, known as iquide in Chilean Spanish, is a fern species endemic to Chile.

It has a distribution range from Concepción to Aisén in Chile.

See also
 Austroblechnum durum

References

 Darian Stark. Enciclopedia de la flora Chilena

Blechnaceae
Ferns of Chile
Endemic flora of Chile